The 1883–84 Scottish Cup was the 11th season of Scotland's most prestigious football knockout competition.  Queen's Park won the competition for the seventh time after Vale of Leven could not field a team on the date fixed for the final due to player illness.

Dumbarton became the first defending champions to unsuccessfully retain the cup after they were knocked out in the first round by Renton.

Calendar

Edinburgh University were given a bye to the third round.
Two teams qualified for the second round after drawing their first round replay.

Notes

Teams
All 132 teams entered the competition in the first round.

First round
Cowlairs, Coupar Angus, Drumlanrig Rangers, Newcastleton and Vale of Avon received a bye to the second round. Edinburgh University received a bye to the third round.

Matches

Replays

Notes

Second round
Cumnock, Hamilton Academical, Morton, St Bernard's and Vale of Leven received a bye to the third round.

Matches

Replay

Third round
Dunblane, Edinburgh University, Pollokshields Athletic and Royal Albert received a bye to the fourth round.

Matches

Replays

Fourth round
Arthurlie received a bye to the fifth round.

Matches

Fifth round
Battlefield, Cambuslang, Cartvale, Hibernian and Queen's Park received a bye to the quarter-finals.

Matches

Replay

Quarter-finals

Matches

Semi-finals

Matches

Final

Vale of Leven did not appear for the final in protest after a request made on the Wednesday before the match was due to take place for a postponement due to bereavement, illness and injury had been refused by the Scottish FA.

See also
1883–84 in Scottish football

References

External links
RSSSF: Scottish Cup 1883–84
London Hearts Scottish Cup Results 1883–84
Scottish Football Archive 1883–84

Cup
Scottish Cup seasons
Scot